William Peter Ginther (FAIA) (March 21, 1858 – January 15, 1933) was an American architect based in Akron, Ohio. He was a prolific designer of Roman Catholic churches, schools and rectories throughout Ohio, Pennsylvania, Indiana, California, Virginia and New York.

Early life and education
Ginther was born in Akron, Ohio, on March 21, 1858.  His parents were Stephen and Anna M. (née Horning) Ginther.  His father was a merchant tailor to the elite of the city.  William attended Akron public schools (including the Jennings School) and was enrolled at Buchtel College for a short time.

Ginther died at his home, 837 Chestnut Boulevard in Cuyahoga Falls, Ohio, on January 15, 1933.

Architectural  career
Reportedly, he drew a comic valentine for a girl, which was seen by Frank Weary, then Akron's leading architect, who then hired Ginther into his office.
Ginther worked at his first architectural position in Weary's office from 1879 through 1886.  He made a tour of Europe in 1889, including the cities of Rome, Milan, Paris, Venice, Florence, London, Berlin, Vienna and many other noted centers of art. Upon his return to Akron he established his own company and, in a period extending over 40 years, he served the needs of many Roman Catholic clients throughout the Midwest.

Legacy
Ginther was named a Fellow of the American Institute of Architects. Many of his buildings are listed in the National Register of Historic Places. One of his churches, Holy Family in Tulsa, Oklahoma, has been raised to the status of a cathedral.

Works

Churches in Ohio
 Annunciation Church, Akron Ohio
 St. Bernard Church and Rectory, Akron, Ohio
 St. Mary Church (original wooden church) and Rectory, Akron, Ohio
 St. Columbia Church (destroyed by fire in 1954), Youngstown, Ohio
 St. John the Baptist Church and Rectory, Columbus, Ohio
 St. Thomas the Apostle Church, Columbus, Ohio
 St. Martin Church (demolished), Cleveland, Ohio
 Holy Trinity Church (closed), Cleveland, Ohio
 Holy Rosary church and rectory, Cleveland, Ohio
 Sacred Heart of Jesus Church, Cleveland, Ohio
 Annunciation Church, (demolished) Cleveland, Ohio
 St. Anthony Church (not St. Maron Church), Cleveland, Ohio
 St. Adelbert's church and rectory, Cleveland, Ohio
 Mother of Sorrows Church and Rectory, Ashtabula, Ohio
 St. Joseph's Church, Ashtabula, Ohio 
 Our Lady of Mt. Carmel (demolished), Ashtabula, Ohio
 St. Luke's Church, Danville, Ohio
 Sacred Heart of Jesus Church, Shelby Settlement, Ohio
 Good Shepherd Church, (closed) Toledo, Ohio;
 Immaculate Conception Church, (not sure if this is still around), Ozark, Ohio
 St. Louis Church, Gallipolis, Ohio
 SS. Cyril & Methodius Church, (demolished) Barberton, Ohio
 St. Patrick Church and Rectory, Bellefontaine, Ohio
 St. Francis Church, Carthagena, Ohio
 Holy Cross Church (demolished), Glouster, Ohio
 St. Michael Church, Gibsonburgh, Ohio
 St. Mary's Church, Antwerp, Ohio 
 St. Mary Church, Payne, Ohio
 St. Nicholas Church, Miller City, Ohio
 St. Michael's Church, North Ridge, Ohio
 St. John's Church, Defiance, Ohio
 St. Mary's Church, Junction, Ohio
 Holy Name Church and Rectory, (church demolished), Steubenville, Ohio
Nativity of the Blessed Virgin Mary, Lorain, Ohio
 Our Lady of Mt. Carmel Church and Rectory, Warren, Ohio
 Sacred Heart Church, Coshocton, Ohio
 St. John's Church, Logan, Ohio
 St. Joseph Church, Randolph, Ohio
 St. Francis Xavier Church, (demolished) Chicago, Ohio
 St. Mary Church, Norwalk, Ohio
 Holy Rosary Church, Lowellville, Ohio
 St. Philip Neri Church and Rectory, (closed), Murray City, Ohio
 St. Peter Church, Mansfield, Ohio
 St. Paul Church,  North Canton, Ohio / New Berlin, Ohio
 St Joseph Church, Circleville, Ohio
 St. Mary's, (remodeled), Massillon, Ohio

Churches in Other States

 Cathedral of the Holy Family, (plan only, his design was not built), Tulsa, Oklahoma
 St. Mary Church and Rectory. McKees Rocks, Pennsylvania
 St. Philip's Church, Crafton, Pennsylvania
 Immaculate Conception Church and Rectory (closed), Johnstown, Pennsylvania
 Immaculate Heart of Mary Church, Pittsburgh, Pennsylvania
 St. Anne Church  Erie, Pennsylvania
 St. Andrew Church  Erie, Pennsylvania
 St. Patrick Church  Erie, Pennsylvania
 Sacred Heart Church, St. Mary's, Pennsylvania
 Most Holy Rosary Church, Johnsonburg, Pennsylvania
 St. Stephen's Church, South Oil City, Pennsylvania
 St. Anthony's Church, Cambridge Springs, Pennsylvania
 St. Andrew's Church, Roanoke, Virginia
 Santa Clara Parish, Oxnard, California
 St. Joseph's Church, Perry, New York
 St. Mary Church, Cortland, New York 
 St. Mary's Church, Clinton, New York
 Holy Family Church, Gas City, Indiana

Parochial residences
 St. John's Rectory, Canton, Ohio
 St. Procop Rectory, Cleveland, Ohio
 St. Augustine Rectory, Lakewood, Ohio
 Immaculate Conception Rectory, Wellsville, Ohio
 St. Pius Rectory, Mexahala, Ohio
 St. Mary Rectory, Shawnee, Ohio
 St. Mary's of the Springs Rectory,  Shepherd, Ohio
 St. Joseph's  Rectory, Randolph, Ohio
 St. John the Baptist Rectory, Columbus, Ohio
 St. Patrick Rectory Buchtel, Ohio

Parochial schools
 St. Bernard's School, Akron, Ohio
 St. Vincent de Paul's School, Akron, Ohio
 St. Mary School, Akron, Ohio
 St. Rose School, Lima, Ohio
 St. Joseph School, at Tiffin, Ohio
 Immaculate Conception School, Youngstown, Ohio
 St. Procop School, Cleveland, Ohio
 St. Colman School, Cleveland, Ohio
 St. Aloysius School, Cleveland, Ohio
 St. Vincent School,  Cleveland, Ohio
 St. Mary School, Conneaut, Ohio
 St. Bernard School, New Washington, Ohio
 St. Joseph School Canton, Ohio
 St. Peter School, Canton, Ohio
 Immaculate Conception School, Canton, Ohio
 St. John's School Canton, Ohio
 St. Mary  School,  Elyria, Ohio
 St. Stephens  School,  Niles, Ohio
 St. Aloysius School, East Liverpool, Ohio
 St. Paul School, Salem, Ohio
 Immaculate Conception School, Wellsville, Ohio
 Holy Name School,  Steubenville, Ohio
 St. Wenbelin's School,  Fostoria, Ohio
 St. Augustine's School, Barberton, Ohio 
 St. Michael's School, Bellaire, Ohio
 St. Mary's School, Piqua, Ohio
 Sacred Heart School,  New Philadelphia, Ohio 
 St. Rosa School, New Lexington, Ohio

Academies
 St. Mary's of the Springs Academy,  Shepherd, Ohio
 St. Aloysius Academy,  New Lexington, Ohio 
 Ursuline convents  Youngstown, Ohio
 Ursuline convents  Tiffin, Ohio
 Villa Angela, an Ursuline academy (remodeled)  Nottingham, Ohio
 Humility of Mary Academy, Mt. Marie, Ohio
 St. Joseph Academy, St. Mary's, Pennsylvania
 St. Anne, Cleveland, Ohio

Hospitals
 Mercy Hospital, Canton, Ohio
 Mount St. Mary's Hospital, Niagara Falls, New York
 St. Francis Hospital, Charleston, West Virginia

References

External links
More than a Building
 

1858 births
1933 deaths
Artists from Akron, Ohio
American ecclesiastical architects
Architects of Roman Catholic churches
Architects from Ohio